Group B of the 2011 FIFA Women's World Cup consisted of the teams from Japan, New Zealand, Mexico and England. The games were played on 27 June, 1 July and 5 July 2011. The top two teams advanced to the knockout stage.

Standings

Matches

Japan vs New Zealand

Mexico vs England

Japan vs Mexico

New Zealand vs England

England vs Japan

New Zealand vs Mexico

References

External links
Group B on fifa.com

Group B
Group
2010–11 in Mexican football
Group
2010–11 in New Zealand association football